is a member of the Japanese Communist Party serving in the House of Representatives. He is against the passed anti-conspiracy bill. He is also against paying welfare benefits with pre-paid credit cards, saying that it would only benefit credit card companies.

References

Living people
Japanese communists
Japanese Communist Party politicians
Members of the House of Representatives (Japan)
Japanese municipal councilors
Politicians from Osaka Prefecture
People from Yokohama
Year of birth missing (living people)